is a Japanese table tennis player. Her father is Japanese, and her mother is a table tennis player from China.

At the age of 18, she made the national team which won a silver medal at the 2016 World Team Table Tennis Championships. She also won gold at the women's doubles at the 2016 ITTF World Tour Grand Finals with Hina Hayata.

Association change  
In 2019, Hamamoto registered with the Austrian Table Tennis Association with hopes to acquire Austrian nationality. According to her family, she did so to continue to play internationally as it had been hard for her to make the Japanese national team again.

In popular culture 
Hamamoto appeared in the 2017 film Mixed Doubles.

References 

1998 births
Living people
Japanese female table tennis players
Sportspeople from Osaka
Japanese sportspeople of Chinese descent
Kinoshita Abyell Kanagawa players